Mid Derbyshire is a constituency represented in the House of Commons of the UK Parliament since its 2010 creation by Pauline Latham, a Conservative.

Constituency profile
The constituency covers a large area to the north and east of Derby. Residents are slightly wealthier than the UK average.

Boundaries

Following their review of parliamentary representation, the Boundary Commission for England created this seat. Neighbouring constituencies have had consequential boundary changes, with Erewash and Amber Valley two of the most affected.

The constituency is made up of the following electoral wards:
Belper Central; Belper East; Belper North; Belper South; Duffield, part of the borough of Amber Valley
Allestree, Oakwood and Spondon, part of the City of Derby
Little Eaton and Breadsall; Ockbrook and Borrowash; Stanley; West Hallam and Dale Abbey, part of the borough of Erewash

Members of Parliament

MPs 1885–1918

MPs since 2010

Elections

Elections in the 2010s

Note: This constituency was a notional hold in 2010, as it would likely have been won by the Conservatives in 2005 had it existed then. This is despite the fact all of the wards were actually within constituencies that Labour held in 2005.

Elections in the 1910s
General Election 1914–15:

Another General Election was required to take place before the end of 1915. The political parties had been making preparations for an election to take place and by July 1914, the following candidates had been selected; 
Liberal: John Hancock
Unionist:

Elections in the 1900s

Hancock, who was sponsored by the Derbyshire Miners Association was chosen by the local Liberal Association as their candidate. During the campaign he agreed that he would sign the Labour Party constitution, so some records describe him as the Labour party candidate.

Elections in the 1890s

Elections in the 1880s

See also
List of parliamentary constituencies in Derbyshire

Notes

References

Parliamentary constituencies in Derbyshire
Constituencies of the Parliament of the United Kingdom established in 1885
Constituencies of the Parliament of the United Kingdom disestablished in 1918
Constituencies of the Parliament of the United Kingdom established in 2010